Per Emanuel Limnell (24 March 1766, Karlskrona2 March 1861, Stockholm) was a Swedish decorative painter and watercolorist.

Biography
He was the eighteenth child born to a shipyard maintenance worker. After his mother's death, when he was seven, he ran away from home and spent five years living with an old village school teacher. The teacher also died, and he had to support himself for several years. He returned home in 1781 and helped his father paint ships, but found the work unpleasant; preferring to paint coffins, sledges, chests and similar items for the local peasants.  

In 1784, thanks to assistance from Admiral Carl Tersmeden, he was able to go to Stockholm and find employment in the stage decoration workshop at the Royal Swedish Opera. In 1791, he was hired as a regular decorative painter there; a position he would hold well into the 19th century. 

On the advice of Desprez and the sculptor, Johan Tobias Sergel, he used the model school at the Royal Swedish Academy of Fine Arts to improve his skills and promote himself. In 1802, he was chosen as an agré (member-candidate) at the Academy and, the following year, was awarded full membership. In 1812, he was named a Professor of drawing and, in 1813, was appointed a court painter. 

He married Ulrika Wargentin in 1791. Their daughter, also became an artist. 

References

External links

Biography from the Svenskt biografiskt handlexikon @ Projekt Runeberg

1766 births
1861 deaths
Swedish painters
Swedish watercolourists
Decorative arts
People from Karlskrona